Convention and Exhibition Center station may refer to the following stations:

 Convention and Exhibition Center station (Dalian Metro), on Line 1 of the Dalian Metro
 Convention and Exhibition Center station (Shenzhen Metro) on Line 1 and Line 4 of the Shenzhen Metro
 Convention and Exhibition City station on Line 20 of the Shenzhen Metro
 Convention and Exhibition Center station (Tianjin Metro) on Line 9 of the Tianjin Metro
 Convention and Exhibition Center station (Zhengzhou Metro) on Line 1 and Line 4 of the Zhengzhou Metro
 Exhibition And Convention Center station (Shaoxing Metro) on Line 1 of the Shaoxing Metro
 BEXCO station, a station on the Busan Metro and Korail in Busan.

See also
 Convention Center station (disambiguation)
 Exhibition station (disambiguation)
 Exhibition Center station (disambiguation)
 Huizhanzhongxin station (disambiguation)
 Exhibition Centre on the East Rail line of the MTR, known as the HKCEC Station in its planning stage